The Royal Society of Literature (RSL) is a learned society founded in 1820, by King George IV, to "reward literary merit and excite literary talent". A charity that represents the voice of literature in the UK, the RSL has about 600 Fellows, elected from among the best writers in any genre currently at work. Additionally, Honorary Fellows are chosen from those who have made a significant contribution to the advancement of literature, including publishers, agents, librarians, booksellers or producers. The society is a cultural tenant at London's Somerset House.

History

The Royal Society of Literature (RSL) was founded in 1820, with the patronage of George IV, to "reward literary merit and excite literary talent", and its first president was Thomas Burgess, Bishop of St David's (who was later translated as Bishop of Salisbury).

At the heart of the RSL is its Fellowship, "which encompasses the most distinguished writers working today", with the RSL Council, Chair and President, who are responsible for its direction and management, being drawn from the Fellowship. As an independent charity, the RSL receives no regular public or government funding, relying on the support of its Members, Patrons, Fellows and friends to continue its work. The RSL has about 600 Fellows, elected from among the best writers in any genre currently at work. Additionally, Honorary Fellows are chosen from those who have made a significant contribution to the advancement of literature, including publishers, agents, librarians, booksellers or producers, or who have rendered special service to the RSL. Paid membership is open to all and offers a variety of benefits.

The society publishes an annual magazine, The Royal Society of Literature Review, and administers a number of literary prizes and awards, including the RSL Ondaatje Prize, the RSL Giles St Aubyn Awards for Non-Fiction, the RSL Encore Award for best second novel of the year and the V. S. Pritchett Memorial Prize for short stories.

In 2000, the RSL published a volume that provides a description and history of the society, written by one of its fellows, Isabel Quigly.

In 2020, the RSL celebrated its 200th anniversary with the announcement of RSL 200, "a five-year festival launched with a series of major new initiatives and 60 new appointments championing the great diversity of writing and writers in the UK". Initiatives included RSL Open (electing new Fellows from communities, backgrounds and experiences currently under-represented in UK literary culture), RSL International Writers (recognising the contribution of writers across the globe to literature in English) and Sky Arts RSL Writers Awards.

In 2021, the RSL launched "Literature Matters: Reading Together", a project aiming to make recreational reading accessible to young people across the UK.

Fellowship 
The society maintains its current level of about 600 Fellows of the Royal Society of Literature: generally 14 new fellows are elected annually, who are accorded the privilege of using the post-nominal letters FRSL.

Past and present fellows include Samuel Taylor Coleridge, J. R. R. Tolkien, W. B. Yeats, Rudyard Kipling, Thomas Hardy, George Bernard Shaw, Arthur Koestler, Chinua Achebe, Ruth Prawer Jhabvala, Robert Ardrey, Sybille Bedford, Muriel Spark, P. J. Kavanagh, and Sir Roger Scruton. Present Fellows include Margaret Atwood, Bernardine Evaristo, David Hare, Kazuo Ishiguro, Hilary Mantel, Andrew Motion, Paul Muldoon, Zadie Smith, Nadeem Aslam, Sarah Waters, Geoffrey Ashe and J. K. Rowling. A newly created fellow inscribes his or her name on the society's official roll using either Byron's pen, T. S. Eliot's fountain pen, which replaced Dickens's quill in 2013, or (as of 2018) George Eliot's pen, with pens belonging to Jean Rhys and Andrea Levy being additional choices from 2020.

From time to time, the RSL confers the honour and title of Companion of Literature to writers of particular note. Additionally, the RSL can bestow its award of the Benson Medal for lifetime service in the field of literature.

Membership 
The RSL runs a membership programme offering a variety of events to members and the general public. Membership of the RSL is open to all.

The RSL also runs an outreach programme, currently for young people and those in prison.

Awards and prizes 
The RSL administers two annual prizes, two awards, and two honours. Through its prize programmes, the RSL supports new and established contemporary writers.

 The RSL Christopher Bland Prize — £10,000 for debut prose writers over the age of 50.
 The Encore Awards — £10,000 for best second novel of the year. The RSL took over the administration of this award in 2016.
 The RSL Giles St Aubyn Awards for Non-Fiction – annual awards, currently one of £10,000 and one of £5,000 and one of £2,500, to authors engaged on their first commissioned works of non-fiction (replaced the Jerwood Award in 2017).
 The RSL Ondaatje Prize – an annual award of £10,000 for a distinguished work of fiction, non-fiction or poetry, evoking the spirit of a place.
 The V. S. Pritchett Memorial Prize – an annual prize of £1,000 for the best unpublished short story of the year.
 The Benson Medal – awarded to those who have done sustained and outstanding service to literature.
 Companion of Literature – the highest honour that the Society can bestow upon a writer.

Council and presidents 
The Council of the Royal Society of Literature is central to the election of new fellows, and directs the RSL's activities through its monthly meetings. Council members serve for a fixed term of four years, with new members being elected by Council when members retire.

 Patron
 Camilla, Queen Consort of the United Kingdom

 President
 Bernardine Evaristo OBE

 Presidents Emeriti
 Sir Michael Holroyd CBE FRHistS C Lit
 Colin Thubron CBE
 Marina Warner DBE

 Chair of Council
 Daljit Nagra MBE

 Vice-Chair of Council
 Irenosen Okojie MBE

 Vice-Presidents

 Lisa Appignanesi OBE
 Simon Armitage CBE
 Mary Beard DBE
 Anne Chisholm OBE
 Maureen Duffy, Benson Medallist
 Maggie Gee OBE
 The Hon. Victoria Glendinning CBE
 Jackie Kay CBE
 Blake Morrison
 Grace Nichols
 Philip Pullman CBE
 Elif Shafak
 Kamila Shamsie
 Colm Tóibín
 Claire Tomalin
 Jenny Uglow OBE, Benson Medallist

Council

 Colin Chisholm, Hon. Treasurer
 Imtiaz Dharker
 Louise Doughty
 Inua Ellams
 Tessa Hadley
 Catherine Johnson
 Helen Mort
 Daljit Nagra MBE
 Susheila Nasta MBE
 Irenosen Okojie MBE
 Michèle Roberts
 Roger Robinson
 Ruth Scurr

 Boyd Tonkin

List of presidents 
 1820–1832: Bishop Thomas Burgess
 1832–1833: The Lord Dover
 1834–1845: The Earl of Ripon
 1845–1849: Henry Hallam
 1849–1851: The Marquess of Northampton
 1851–1856: The Earl of Carlisle
 1856–1876: The Rt Rev. Connop Thirlwall (Bishop of St David's until 1874)
 1876–1884: The Prince Leopold (Duke of Albany from 1881)
 1885–1893: Sir Patrick Colquhoun
 1893–1920: The Earl of Halsbury
 1921–1945: The Marquess of Crewe
 1946–1947: The Earl of Lytton
 1947–1982: The Lord Butler of Saffron Walden
 1982–1988: Sir Angus Wilson
 1988–2003: The Lord Jenkins of Hillhead
 2003–2008: Sir Michael Holroyd
 2008–2017: Colin Thubron
 2017–2021: Marina Warner
 2022–present: Bernardine Evaristo

Fellows 

The Royal Society of Literature comprises more than 600 Fellows, who are entitled to use the post-nominal letters FRSL.

New fellows of the Royal Society of Literature are elected by its current fellows. To be nominated for fellowship, a writer must have published two works of literary merit, and nominations must be seconded by an RSL fellow. All nominations are presented to members of the Council of the Royal Society of Literature, who vote biannually to elect new fellows. Nominated candidates who have not been successful are reconsidered at every election for three years from the year in which they were proposed. Newly elected fellows are introduced at the Society's AGM and summer party. While the President reads a citation for each, they are invited to sign their names in the roll book which dates back to 1820, using either T. S. Eliot's fountain pen or Byron's pen. In 2013, Charles Dickens' quill was retired and replaced with Eliot's fountain pen, and in 2018 George Eliot's pen was offered as a choice, the first time in the RSL's history that a pen that belonged to a woman writer was an option. 

In 2018, the RSL honoured the achievements of Britain's younger writers through the initiative "40 Under 40", which saw the election of 40 new fellows aged under 40.

In 2020, pens belonging to Andrea Levy and Jean Rhys were added to the choices offered to fellows for signing the RSL roll book.

Current fellows 

The * before the name denotes an Honorary Fellow. The list is online at the RSL website.

RSL International Writers
The RSL International Writers programme is a new life-long honour and award recognizing the contribution of writers across the globe to literature in English, and the power of literature to transcend borders in bringing people together.

References

External links 
 The Royal Society of Literature website
 RSL Review magazine
 RSL literary prizes and awards
 Current RSL Fellows
 Roy Jenkins & The Royal Society of Literature – UK Parliament Living Heritage

 
1820 establishments in the United Kingdom
British literature
Learned societies of the United Kingdom
Organizations established in 1820
Organisations based in London with royal patronage